The Acts of Thaddeus (Greek: Πραξεὶ̀ς τοῦ Θαδδαίου) is a Greek document written between 544 and  which purports to describe correspondence between King Abgar V of Edessa and Jesus, which results in Jesus' disciple Thaddeus going to Edessa.

Authorship 
Most scholars now believe that the Acts of Thaddeus was written in the seventh century at the earliest. Palmer dates it to the seventh century, and had specifically suggested between 629–630, although this has been rejected by Angelo Gramaglia. Mirkovic notes that it is typically dated after the public appearance of the Image of Edessa in 544, and considers the iconoclasm controversy of the eighth century as the most probably context.

Writers frequently confuse the Greek Acts of Thaddeus with the Syriac Doctrine of Addai.

It is generally agreed to be a later development of the tradition described in the Legend of Abgar told by Eusebius.

Contents 
The Acts of Thaddeus describes correspondence between King Abgar V of Edessa and Jesus, which results in Jesus' disciple Thaddeus going to Edessa and performing miracles there including the healing of Abgar.

Purpose 
The Acts of Thaddeus shows significant development in the Abgar tradition since the earlier Doctrine of Addai, placing much more emphasis on the miraculous character of the Image of Edessa, while minimizing the significance of human actors.

Aquilina regards it as doctrinally orthodox and unconcerned for historical accuracy.

William Schoedel asserts that the author of the Acts of Thaddeus confused the apostle Thaddeus with a different Syrian Christian figure named Addai.

Reception 
The Acts of Thaddeus was included in the biblical canon of Gregory of Tatev, although no biblical manuscripts have been found which include it. Modern scholars have found it to be significant for its descriptions of the sacraments of initiation. The Acts of Thaddeus is often studied by those seeking to associate the Image of Edessa with the Shroud of Turin; Nicolotti considers their interpretations quite biased. In 2014, Stephen Andrew Missick wrote a script for a film entitled "The Acts of the Apostle Thaddeus: The Birth of Christianity in Assyria" based on the Acts of Thaddeus and other ancient sources.

Versions

Original manuscripts 
 Parisinus Graecus 548 (10th century, Greek)
 Vindobonensis historicus graecus 45 (11th century, Greek)

Published editions

Greek

English

Other languages

See also 
 Abgar V#Critical scholarship
 Acts of Mar Mari
 Doctrine of Addai
 Preaching of Thaddeus
 Abgar Legend

Notes

Citations

References 

 
 
 
 
 
 
 
 
 
  Also available via ProQuest.

Further reading 

 
 
 
 
 
 

7th-century Christian texts
8th-century Christian texts
Thaddeus
Christian hagiography
Osroene
Seventy disciples
Syriac Christianity
Texts in Syriac